Waal may refer to:

Places
 Waal, Bavaria, a town in Germany
 Waal, South Holland, a hamlet in the Dutch province of South Holland
 Waal (river), a Rhine distributary in the Netherlands
 Waaltje, formally the Waal, a dammed river in the Netherlands

People with surname Waal
 Kadhim Waal (1951–2017), Iraqi footballer
 Giovanni Waal (born 1989), Surinamese footballer
 Nic Waal (1905–1960), Norwegian psychiatrist
 Willemijn Waal (born 1975), Dutch Hittitologist and Classicist.

Other uses
 Waal (ship, 1959), a former Dutch ferry now known as Tanja
 WAAL, a classic rock FM radio station licensed to Binghamton, New York

See also

De Waal, a village in the Dutch province of North Holland
De Waal (surname)
Van der Waal (disambiguation)

Wal (disambiguation)
Wahl (disambiguation)
WHAL (disambiguation)
Wall (disambiguation)